The lazy cisticola (Cisticola aberrans) is a species of bird in the family Cisticolidae. It is widespread throughout sub-Saharan Africa.

It is found in Angola, Benin, Botswana, Burkina Faso, Cameroon, Central African Republic, Chad, Democratic Republic of the Congo, Ivory Coast, Eswatini, Ghana, Guinea, Kenya, Liberia, Malawi, Mali, Mauritania, Mozambique, Niger, Nigeria, Rwanda, Sierra Leone, South Africa, Sudan, Tanzania, Togo, Uganda, Zambia, and Zimbabwe. Its natural habitat is subtropical or tropical dry lowland grassland. It is usually associated with rocky wooded terrain with interspersed patchy grass tussocks. Usually at the foot of hills or in adjacent riparian vegetation.

It is sometimes split into two species: lazy cisticola (C. aberrans) in the southern part of its range and rock-loving cisticola (C. emini) further north.

References

External links
 Lazy cisticola - Species text in The Atlas of Southern African Birds.

lazy cisticola
Birds of Sub-Saharan Africa
lazy cisticola
Taxonomy articles created by Polbot